Spartacus: War of the Damned is the third and final season of the American television series Spartacus, a Starz television series, which follows Spartacus: Vengeance. The series was inspired by the historical figure of Spartacus (played by Liam McIntyre from the second season and by Andy Whitfield in the first season), a Thracian gladiator who, from 73 to 71 BC, led a major slave uprising against the Roman Republic. It premiered on January 25, 2013, and concluded on April 12, 2013.

Cast and characters

Main cast

Rebels
Liam McIntyre as Spartacus – a Thracian warrior condemned to slavery as a gladiator in the House of Batiatus. After leading an uprising at the ludus, he and his rebel army have experienced great success against the forces of Rome, but are in for a great struggle against the forces of Crassus.
Manu Bennett as Crixus – a Gallic warrior who is the second-in-command in the rebel revolt. Naevia's lover.
Dustin Clare as Gannicus – a Celtic warrior, and former gladiator who has taken up arms against the Republic to honor the memory of Oenomaus.
Dan Feuerriegel as Agron – a Germanic warrior, leader among the rebel army and Nasir's lover.
Cynthia Addai-Robinson as Naevia – a Phoenician former slave. She struggles with the emotional wounds that were inflicted upon her by various Roman abusers. Crixus' lover.
Ellen Hollman as Saxa – a Germanic warrior and Gannicus' lover.
Pana Hema Taylor as Nasir – a Syrian warrior and Agron's lover.
Blessing Mokgohloa as Castus – a Cilician pirate who joins the rebellion.
Ditch Davey as Nemetes – a Germanic warrior who is conflicted about the rebellion, and his role in it.
Anna Hutchison as Laeta – a Roman citizen and well-to-do wife whose life is changed forever when her husband is killed and she is taken captive by Spartacus after the rebel invasion of her city. Laeta eventually joins the rebellion and becomes Spartacus' lover; after she is unjustly branded as a slave by Crassus for aiding the rebels, despite the fact that she only did it to save her people.
Jenna Lind as Kore – Crassus' loyal body slave and lover, unfortunate events will test her loyalty to the House of Crassus. Kore eventually joins the rebellion; after she is raped by her former friend, Tiberius, as revenge against his father, Crassus.
Gwendoline Taylor as Sibyl – a young slave who becomes smitten with Gannicus after he saves her life.
Barry Duffield as Lugo – a Germanic warrior.
Heath Jones as Donar – a former gladiator from the House of Batiatus, and a loyal warrior in the rebellion.
Luna Rioumina as Belesa – Saxa's second lover. 
Ayşe Tezel as Canthara – a slave whose life is saved by Julius Caesar.
Vanessa Cater as Verenda – a rebel from Gaul that fought under Crixus.

Romans
Simon Merrells as Marcus Licinius Crassus – The richest man in Rome. After many unsuccessful attempts at ending the revolt, the Roman senate tasks Crassus with the responsibility of putting down the rebellion.
Christian Antidormi as Tiberius Licinius Crassus – The eldest son of Marcus Licinius Crassus, and his father's "word and will" in Crassus' army.
Aaron Jakubenko as Sabinus - The best friend of Tiberius and his second in command.
Todd Lasance as Julius Caesar – A young, but seasoned soldier from a prominent family who is enlisted by Crassus to conduct infiltration and sabotage operations against the rebel camp, before returning as Crassus' second-highest-ranking officer (under his son, Tiberius).
Roy Snow as Quintus Marcius Rufus – Crassus' commander.
Jared Turner as Lucius Furius – Tribune of Cossinius.
John Wraight as Lucius Cossinius – A praetor sent to defeat Spartacus.
Joel Tobeck in a cameo role as Gnaeus Pompeius Magnus, (also known as Pompey or Pompey The Great)- A praetor from Rome, part of the military-political alliance known as the First Triumvirate with Marcus Licinius Crassus and Gaius Julius Caesar.

Episodes

References

2013 American television seasons
Depictions of Julius Caesar on television
Spartacus (TV series)
Cultural depictions of Pompey
Cultural depictions of Marcus Licinius Crassus